The Wallkill Central School District is centered in Wallkill, New York. It has three elementary schools, one middle school, and one high school. As of 2006, the school district has about 3,700 students. The district's offices are located in Wallkill and its current superintendent is Mr. Kevin Castle.

While most of its students live in the area commonly identified as Wallkill, primarily the eastern half of the Town of Shawangunk, some come from adjacent areas in the Orange County towns of Montgomery and Newburgh.

Schools

 Wallkill Senior High School
 John G. Borden Middle School
 Ostrander Elementary School
 Plattekill Elementary School
 Leptondale Elementary School

Board of education
 Mr. Dennis O'Mara,
 Mr. Tom McCullough, Vice-President
 Mrs. Kathryn Anderson
 Mr. Joseph Locicero, President
 Mr. Steven Missale
 Mr. Thomas Frisbie
 Mr. Lief Spencer
 Mr. Vincent Petrocelli
 Mrs. Donna Crowley

External links
  Wallkill Central School District (official website)

School districts in New York (state)
Education in Ulster County, New York
Shawangunk, New York